Kappumthala is a village in Kottayam district in the state of Kerala, India.

The nearest railway station is at Kuruppanthara and Vaikom road.

26 kilometers from Kottayam and 48 kilometers from Ernakulam.

References 

Villages in Kottayam district